Joseph Henry Brown (July 3, 1900 – March 7, 1950) was a Major League Baseball pitcher who played in one game for the Chicago White Sox on May 17, . He faced 3 batters, gave up two hits, one base on balls, and three earned runs.

External links

Retrosheet

Major League Baseball pitchers
Chicago White Sox players
Oklahoma City Indians players
Kansas City Blues (baseball) players
Shreveport Sports players
Houston Buffaloes players
Baseball players from Arkansas
1900 births
1950 deaths
Sportspeople from Little Rock, Arkansas